Black Sheep Restaurants is a Hong Kong-based hospitality group. Founded by Syed Asim Hussain in 2012, the group operates over two dozen restaurants in the city. Black Sheep's portfolio includes restaurants serving Punjabi, Cantonese, Sichuanese, Indian, Mexican, and Italian cuisines. Two of the group's restaurants, BELON and New Punjab Club, hold a Michelin Star.

Restaurants 
Active Restaurants (restaurants denoted with * hold a Michelin Star)

 Ho Lee Fook
 BELON*
 New Punjab Club*
 Chôm Chôm
 Grand Majestic Sichuan
 Motorino

COVID-19 pandemic 
Amidst the COVID-19 pandemic in Hong Kong, the group published a "Covid-19 Playbook" in 2020 to provide guidelines for restaurant operating procedures during the pandemic. In 2021, the group had paid at least $650,000 to cover travel costs for staff members to travel home, along with undergo quarantine in Hong Kong.

References 

Hospitality companies of Hong Kong
Restaurants in Hong Kong
Catering and food service companies of Hong Kong
Food and drink companies of Hong Kong
Hong Kong cuisine